The Curtiss Model S (also known as Speed Scout or Model 10) was a single-seat fighter aircraft.

Development and design
The Model S was Curtiss' first attempt at a fast and maneuverable single-seat fighter. The first variant, S-1, had disappointing performance. In March 1917, new wings were attached to the S-1 fuselage and the project was redesignated S-2. In 1917, the S-3 became the first triplane in service in the United States. In 1918 and 1919, Curtiss experimented with seaplane versions of the S-3, designated S-4 and S-5. The S-6 was intended to be an improved S-3, but performance was poor and of the 12 ordered by the USASC, only 1 was delivered.

Variants

S-1 Speed Scout Biplane, unarmed
S-2 Wireless Biplane, updated S-1 lacked wing wires. First flight in March 1917.
S-3  Model 10 - Triplane derived from S-2. Four built.
S-4  Model 10A - Seaplane version of S-3 with 2 main floats
S-5  Model 10B - Seaplane version of S-3 with 1 main central float and two wingtip floats.
S-6  Model 10C - Triplane, improved S-3

Specifications (S-3)

References

Bibliography
 
 

1910s United States fighter aircraft
Model S
Single-engined tractor aircraft
Triplanes
Aircraft first flown in 1917